Alexander Stolz (born 13 October 1983 in Pforzheim) is a German football goalkeeper who currently plays for TSG 1899 Hoffenheim.

Stolz joined VfB Stuttgart from the Regionalliga side FC Nöttingen during summer 2005, initially playing for the club's reserve team. During the 2006–07 season, the club loaned him out to TSG Hoffenheim. 

He eventually made his first-team debut for Stuttgart in July 2008, playing in both of their UEFA Intertoto Cup matches against FC Saturn. On 5 March 2009, Stolz extended his contract at Stuttgart until summer 2012.

On 24 January 2012, Stolz moved to Karlsruher SC, where he played for six months.

References

External links
 

Living people
1983 births
German footballers
Footballers from Baden-Württemberg
Association football goalkeepers
VfB Stuttgart players
VfB Stuttgart II players
TSG 1899 Hoffenheim players
Karlsruher SC players
3. Liga players
FC Nöttingen players